Track & Field II, known in Japan as Konami Sports in Seoul, is a sequel to Track & Field created by Konami for the NES in 1988. It still continues the Olympic-themed sports events, but adds more realism by choosing a country for the player to represent. The series boasted 15 sporting events, with two of them available as bonus stages between rounds of the "Olympic" mode.

Game modes
 Training is a basic training of the events to test out the abilities of the player in each event.
 Olympic is the story mode of the game where the player represents his or her country and competes with the world's best.
 Versus is where two players compete head-to-head in the sporting events.

Sporting events
 Fencing
 Triple jump
 Freestyle Swimming
 High Dive
 Clay Pigeon Shooting
 Hammer throw
 Taekwondo
 Pole vault
 Canoeing
 Archery
 Hurdles
 Horizontal Bar
 Hang Gliding (bonus event)
 Arm wrestling in Versus Mode only (in Exhibition against a computer in the Japanese version)
 Gun Firing (bonus event; not available in the Japanese version)

The triple jump, freestyle swimming, clay pigeon shooting, pole vault, and archery events were previously featured in Hyper Sports. The hammer throw and hurdles events were originally featured in the original Track and Field. Although gymnastics was featured in Hyper Sports, that game had the vaulting horse rather than the horizontal bar.

Countries

Extras
The game has a password feature allowing the player to continue playing from their last position at another time.
In addition, the Gun Firing exhibition event could be played with either the NES Controller or the NES Zapper.

Reception
The game topped the bi-weekly Japanese Famitsu sales chart in October 1988, dethroning Dragon Ball: Daimaō Fukkatsu.

Notes

References

1988 Summer Olympics
1988 video games
Konami games
Nintendo Entertainment System games
Nintendo Entertainment System-only games
Summer Olympic video games
Video game sequels
Video games set in 1988
Video games set in Seoul
Multiplayer and single-player video games
Athletics video games
Video games developed in Japan